The bidding process for UEFA Euro 2028 will be the process by which the location for the 18th European Championship, commonly referred to as Euro 2028, will be selected.

Hosting requirements
Bid requirements must contain specific criteria relating to the respect of human rights, based on the United Nations "Guiding Principles on Business and Human Rights".

The tournament is expected to continue the format of the 2016, 2020 and 2024 editions, with a total of 51 matches taking place for a duration of up to 32 days, with 24 teams competing in the tournament.

The required capacities for the ten stadiums are as follows:
 1 stadium with 60,000 seats
 1 stadium (preferably 2) with 50,000 seats
 4 stadiums with 40,000 seats
 3 stadiums with 30,000 seats

Schedule

Bids

Confirmed plan to bid

Great Britain and Ireland

 (– Northern Ireland– Scotland– Wales)– Republic of Ireland – On 5 January 2022, the football associations of England, Northern Ireland, Scotland, Wales and the Republic of Ireland announced a joint Ireland and United Kingdom bid for the UEFA Euro 2028, which meant their own 2030 World Cup bid would be unsustainable. The five associations confirmed on 7 February that they would drop their 2030 interest and would instead focus on Euro 2028. On 5 March 2022, media outlets in Ireland and UK reported that the Ireland and UK bid would be the sole remaining bid, with Turkey set to withdraw its bid, and Russia barred from applying.

On 16 November 2022, a shortlist of 14 host stadiums was revealed, a final list of 10 stadiums will be submitted to UEFA in April 2023:
Cardiff, Wales – Principality Stadium, capacity 73,931
Belfast, Northern Ireland – Casement Park, proposed capacity 34,578 (redevelopment due 2023)
Birmingham, England – Villa Park, capacity 42,682 (redevelopment confirmed taking stadiums capacity to around 50,000)
Dublin, Republic of Ireland – Aviva Stadium, capacity 51,700
Dublin, Republic of Ireland – Croke Park, capacity 82,300
Glasgow, Scotland – Hampden Park, capacity 51,866
Liverpool, England – Everton Stadium, capacity 52,888 (Under Construction)
London, England – London Stadium, capacity 66,000
London, England – Tottenham Hotspur Stadium, capacity 62,850
London, England – Wembley Stadium, capacity 90,000
Manchester, England – City of Manchester Stadium, capacity 53,000 (or 62,170 after possible expansion)
Manchester, England – Old Trafford, capacity 74,310
Newcastle, England – St James' Park, capacity 52,305
Sunderland, England – Stadium of Light, capacity 49,000

Turkey

 – On 15 August 2019, the Turkish Football Federation announced that Turkey would bid to host Euro 2028. The Federation confirmed the submission of its application on 23 March 2022. Turkey's bid is the sixth consecutive bid of the country, having been unsuccessful on the previous five occasions (2008, 2012, 2016, 2020 and 2024).
 Ankara – New Ankara Stadium, capacity 65,307
 Antalya – New Antalya Stadium, capacity 43,616 (after expansion)
 Bursa – Timsah Arena, capacity 43,331
 Eskişehir – New Eskişehir Stadium, capacity 34,930
 Gaziantep – New Gaziantep Stadium, capacity 35,219
 Istanbul – Atatürk Olympic Stadium, capacity 92,208 (after expansion)
 Istanbul – Nef Stadium, capacity 53,611 (after renovation)
 İzmit – İzmit Stadium, capacity 34,712
 Konya – Konya Büyükşehir Stadium, capacity 37,829 (after renovation)
 Trabzon – Şenol Güneş Stadium, capacity 43,233 (after renovation)

Previously expressed interest in bidding 
These teams previously expressed interest in bidding, but did not submit a bid
 and  – On 12 September 2018, the Royal Spanish Football Federation announced intentions of a joint bid together with the Portuguese Football Federation for Euro 2028 or the 2030 World Cup.

Abandoned bids
 – In February 2019, Italian Football Federation President Gabriele Gravina told Sky Sport Italia that the federation was considering a bid. The bid was proposed again by Gravina some few days after Italy's win at Euro 2020. In February 2022, the Italian federation announced it would bid for Euro 2032, instead of 2028, as it would allow them more time to redevelop facilities.

Ineligible bids
 – On 12 June 2021, Alexej Sorokin, the organising committee director of Euro 2020 host Saint Petersburg, proposed an application from Russia for Euro 2028 or 2032. This was reaffirmed on 23 March 2022, the deadline for bids. On 2 May 2022, UEFA declared their bids for 2028 and 2032 as ineligible due to the 2022 Russian invasion of Ukraine, citing that it breaches article 16.2 of the Bid Regulations, which state "each bidder shall ensure that it does not act in a manner that could bring UEFA, any other bidder, the bidding procedure or European football into disrepute".

References

Bids
2028